John Stephen DeMerit (born January 8, 1936 in West Bend, Wisconsin) is an American former professional baseball player from Port Washington, Wisconsin. He was an outfielder over parts or all of five seasons (1957–1959; 1961–1962) with the Milwaukee Braves and New York Mets.

Under the bonus rule then in force, the Braves were required to keep DeMerit on their big-league roster for all of 1957. DeMerit got into 33 games, six as a starting outfielder, but collected only five singles in 34 at bats. Still, Milwaukee won the National League pennant and drew the New York Yankees as their opponents in the 1957 World Series. DeMerit appeared in one contest, as a pinch runner for veteran catcher Del Rice in the eighth inning of Game 3. He failed to score a run and the Braves fell, 12–3. But they outlasted the Yankees in seven games to become world champions.

He appeared in only 34 games and hit a poor .162 with 12 hits, but those dozen included his first two MLB home runs, hit off five-time All-Star Larry Jackson April 26 and future Baseball Hall of Famer Sandy Koufax September 15.
 
The Braves left him unprotected in the 1961 National League expansion draft, where he was selected by the Mets with their tenth pick, 20th overall, in the lottery's regular phase. He made the 1962 Mets early-season roster and appeared in 14 games during the season's first month. On May 15, he singled, walked and hit his third big-league home run (off Dick Ellsworth), scoring the winning run in a 6–5 New York triumph. Such victories were rare, as the Mets won only 40 games all season. The two hits were the last of DeMerit's career: he retired at age 26, rather than report to Triple-A when the Mets attempted to farm him out a few days later.

For his career, DeMerit hit .174 with 23 hits, three doubles, three home runs and seven runs batted in in 93 games played.

References

External links

1936 births
Living people
Atlanta Crackers players
Baseball players from Wisconsin
Jacksonville Braves players
Louisville Colonels (minor league) players
Major League Baseball outfielders
Milwaukee Braves players
New York Mets players
People from West Bend, Wisconsin
Sportspeople from the Milwaukee metropolitan area
University of Wisconsin–Madison alumni
Wisconsin Badgers baseball players
People from Port Washington, Wisconsin